PBA on USA is a presentation of professional ten-pin bowling matches from the Professional Bowlers Association Tour formerly produced by the USA cable television in the United States from 1982 to 1984.

Coverage overview

The USA Network broadcast matches every Thursday night. USA's first telecast was the Kessler Open from San Jose, California in July 1982.

Commentators included play-by-play announcers Eddie Doucette, Pete Liebengood, and Al Trautwig and color commentators Mike Durbin and Earl Anthony.

References

USA Network Sports
USA Network original programming
USA
1982 American television series debuts
1984 American television series endings